Superior is an unincorporated community in McDowell County, West Virginia, United States.

The community most likely was named after the Lake Superior Coal Company.

References

Unincorporated communities in McDowell County, West Virginia
Unincorporated communities in West Virginia
Coal towns in West Virginia